Structure The Spin Dr. is the stage name of DJ Jonathan DePrisco. He spent his early career as a resident DJ at large NYC nightclubs including Limelight, The Roxy, and The Tunnel. In 2009 Structure developed a reality television show entitled Party Hard about the culture of New York DJs, however the project was not picked up after the filming of the pilot. On October 16, 2010, Structure performed the entrance music for heavyweight fighter Shannon Briggs live as a part of his ringside team before his title fight with WBC Heavyweight Champion Vitali Klitschko, a performance viewed by over 20 million people. RTL news in Germany highlighted the performance before Brigg's entrance as "Sports meets Entertainment" in the run up to the event. Structure has also performed at several large-scale events, including the 2012 Sundance Film Festival, the Chelsea Hotel, and various fashion shows. Earlier in his career Structure played a style of music he called "Glam Hop", which was a blend of Hip Hop, House music, and an eclectic collection of other genres. In 2012 Structure was involved in court case at the New York Supreme Court, when the former groom at a wedding at which he was supposed to perform sued his fiancé over the deposit paid on his services. He is also active on social media, with over 60,000 Twitter followers.

References

External links
 Interview with Pink Avenue

Living people
American DJs
Year of birth missing (living people)